Francesco Valaperta (Milan, 1836 – 1908) was an Italian painter.

Biography
A pupil of Francesco Hayez at the Brera in Milan, Valaperta made his debut at the Academy’s annual exhibition in 1859 with a painting on a religious subject, followed in later years by works of a historical and literary character. Having adapted in the late 1860s to the great demand of contemporary collectors for subjects of a more intimate nature, he took part in the 2nd Esposizione Nazionale di Belle Arti at the Palazzo di Brera in 1872 and then went on to produce genre scenes in the manner of Gerolamo Induno and Eleuterio Pagliano. He received numerous commissions from important figures in Milan’s middle-class society and also from the Ospedale Maggiore for portraits of its benefactors. He presented a group of portraits at the 2nd Milan Triennale in 1894.

In 1886 in Milan, he exhibits a canvas depicting the Death of Charles Emmanuel II. Among other works are: Queen Elisabeth of England refuses to suspend the execution of Mary Stuart despite the request by the Scottish Ambassador, exhibited at Parma in 1870. In 1877 in Naples, he exhibited the Last Supper of Mary Stuart. Also in 1877 in Milan, he exhibited a portrait of a lady, and La musica buffa; I facili ammiratori; Mi ama o non mi ama?.

References
 Laura Casone, Francesco Valaperta, online catalogue Artgate by Fondazione Cariplo, 2010, CC BY-SA (source for the first revision of this article).

Other projects

19th-century Italian painters
Italian male painters
20th-century Italian painters
20th-century Italian male artists
1836 births
1908 deaths
Brera Academy alumni
19th-century Italian male artists